Haalu Thuppa is a 2017 Indian Kannada-language romantic drama film directed by Shashank Raj and produced by Dodmane Venkatesh. The movie cast includes Gadappa, Samhita Vinya, Century Gowda, Honnavalli Krishna and Nagaraj Kote are in the lead roles.

Cast
Gadappa
Samhita Vinya
Century Gowda 
Singri Gowda
Honnavalli Krishna
Nagaraj Kote

References

External links 
 

2010s Kannada-language films
2017 romantic drama films